Pogon  may refer to:

 Pogon, Albania, a municipality in Gjirokastër District, Gjirokastër County, Albania
 Pogoń, a Knight-in-pursuit coat of arms of the Grand Duchy of Lithuania
 Pogoni, a municipality in Ioannina regional unit, Greece
 Pogoń Siedlce, a Polish football club
 Pogoń Siedlce, a Polish rugby union club
 Pogoń Szczecin, a Polish football club